This is a list of countries and other inhabited territories of the world by total population, based on estimates published by the United Nations in the 2022 revision of World Population Prospects. These figures refer to the de facto population in a country or area as shown in the "estimates" section.



See also

World 
List of countries and dependencies by population
List of countries by past and projected future population
List of countries by population in 2000
List of countries by population in 2010

Continental 
Demographics of Antarctica
List of African countries by population
List of Asian countries by population
List of European countries by population
List of European countries by population growth rate
List of North American countries by population
List of Oceanian countries by population
List of South American countries by population

Transcontinental 
List of Arab countries by population
List of countries in the Americas by population
List of Latin American countries by population
List of Eurasian countries by population
List of Middle Eastern countries by population

Subregional 
List of Caribbean countries by population

Others 
List of European Union member states by population
List of member states of the Commonwealth of Nations by population
List of population concern organizations

Explanatory notes

References

External links 
 World Population Prospects, the 2019 Revision
 Data sources for the World Population Prospects
 Methodology of the United Nations Population Estimates and Projections

 
Lists of countries by continent